Grotesque Wedlock is a compilation of Dr. Shrinker's three studio demos.

1-12 are from Wedding The Grotesque Demo 1989

13-14 are from The Eponym Demo 1990 (produced by Eric Greif)

15-19 are from Recognition Demo 1988

NOTE: The 2013 reissue includes a hidden track "Our Necropsy" after the song Germ Farm.

Track listing 
"Tools of The Trade" - 3:32
"Mesmerization (of A Corpse)" - 4:56
"Fungus" - 4:01
"Rawhead Rex" - 4:14
"Cerebral Seizure" - 3:06
"Dead By Dawn" - 4:01
"Open-Heart Surgery" - 3:28
"No Way To Live" - 3:47
"Pronounced Dead" - 5:39
"Chunk Blower" - 4:04
"Bacterial Encroachment" - 4:38
"Wedding The Grotesque" - 1:53
"Tighten The Tourniquet" - 4:32
"Germ Farm" - 4:46
"The Command" - 1:22
"March of The Undead" - 3:02
"Graphic Violence" - 3:58
"Inverted Direction" - 1:41
"Free At Lasssst!!!" - 1:59

2005 albums
Dr. Shrinker (band) albums